is a train station in Ube, Yamaguchi Prefecture, Japan.

Lines
West Japan Railway Company
Ube Line

Railway stations in Japan opened in 1924
Railway stations in Yamaguchi Prefecture